Tales from the Darkside: The Movie is a 1990 American comedy horror anthology film directed by John Harrison, serving as a spin-off of the anthology television series Tales from the Darkside. The film depicts a kidnapped paperboy who tells three stories of horror to the suburban witch who is preparing to eat him.

Plot

Prologue
Betty, an affluent suburban housewife and modern-day witch, plans a dinner party for her fellow witches. The main dish is to be Timmy, a young boy whom she has captured and chained up in her pantry. To stall her from stuffing and roasting him, the boy tells her three horror stories from a book she gave him, titled ''Tales from the Darkside''.

Lot 249
A graduate student, Edward Bellingham, has been cheated by two classmates, Susan, and Lee, who framed him for theft to ruin his chances of winning a scholarship for which they were competing. As revenge, Bellingham reanimates a mummy and uses it to murder them both. Susan's brother Andy kidnaps Bellingham, forces him to summon the mummy, then destroys it and burns its remains and what he believes to be the reanimation parchment. He considers killing Bellingham, but in the end cannot bring himself to commit real murder. However, Bellingham brings Susan and Lee back from the dead (having switched the reanimation parchment with a similar one) and dispatches them to Andy's dorm, where they greet the terrified Andy by saying that Bellingham sends his regards.

The Cat from Hell
Drogan, a wealthy old man who uses a wheelchair, brings in a hitman named Halston for a bizarre hire: kill a black cat, which Drogan believes is murderously evil. Drogan explains that there were three other occupants of his house before the cat arrived: his sister, Amanda, her friend Carolyn, and the family's butler, Richard Gage. Drogan claims that one by one, the cat killed the other three, and that he is next. Drogan's pharmaceutical company killed 5,000 cats while testing a new drug, and he is convinced that this black cat is here to exact cosmic revenge.

Halston does not believe the story, but is more than willing to eliminate the cat since Drogan is offering $100,000. But when Drogan returns to the house to see if the deed is done, he finds that the cat has killed Halston by climbing down his throat. The cat emerges from the hitman's corpse and jumps at Drogan, giving him a fatal heart attack.

Lover's Vow
Preston is a struggling artist. He lives in a studio with a skylight, through which a large stone gargoyle on the neighboring building, peers down. Preston's agent calls, asking to meet with him at a bar a few blocks away. The agent tells Preston that his artwork is unpopular and not selling. Dejected, Preston drinks heavily and at the end of the night, the bar owner who is a friend of his, offers to walk him home.

Along the way, Preston stops to relieve himself in a back alley, when his friend sees and shoots at a gargoyle monster. The creature attacks, severing his hand and then decapitating him. Terrified, Preston tries to run away, but the creature corners him and speaks, agreeing to spare his life if he swears never to reveal what he has seen. The monster scratches Preston's chest, saying "Cross your heart?", then vanishes.

Preston runs into another alley where he bumps into a lone woman named Carola. She claims to have become lost while going to meet friends and was searching for a taxi. Preston convinces her to call a taxi from his apartment, where Carola cleans the gargoyle-inflicted wound on his chest, and they have sex with each other.

Preston's life soon improves, and his struggling art career becomes wildly successful, mostly thanks to Carola's connections. They eventually marry and have two children. Preston is still tormented by memories of the gargoyle though, and his vow of silence weighs heavily on him. On the tenth anniversary of him first meeting Carola, Preston breaks down and tells her about the monster. Carola appears uncomfortable by his revelation and then emits a heartbroken wail, "You promised you'd never tell!", revealing herself as the creature that killed his friend.

With Preston's vow broken, Carola can no longer remain human and begins transforming back into a gargoyle. Their children are screaming in the bedroom as they also transform into gargoyles. Carola, now fully transformed, wraps her wings around Preston and the couple proclaim their love for each other, but with the vow broken, Carola is still reluctantly forced to kill him by biting his neck, before flying away with her gargoyle children. The final scene shows the three gargoyles now turned to stone and sitting upon the building ledge, staring down at the city with sorrowful expressions.

Epilogue
Betty remarks that Timmy saved the best story ("Lover's Vow") for last, but he says that the next one is best, and has a happy ending. She replies that it is too late as she has to start cooking him, and that none of the stories in the book have happy endings. As Betty advances on Timmy, he narrates his own actions: throwing some marbles on the floor, causing her to slip and fall on her butcher's block and impaling her on her own tools. Timmy releases himself and pushes her into her own oven. The film ends with Timmy helping himself to a cookie and breaking the fourth wall by saying "Don't you just love happy endings?"

Cast

Wraparound Story
Deborah Harry as Betty
Matthew Lawrence as Timmy

Lot 249
Steve Buscemi as Edward Bellingham 
Julianne Moore as Susan Smith
Christian Slater as Andy Smith
Robert Sedgwick as Lee
Donald Van Horn as Moving Man
Michael Deak as Mummy
George Guidall as Museum Director
Kathleen Chalfant as Dean
Ralph Marrero as Cabbie

Cat from Hell
William Hickey as Drogan
David Johansen as Halston
Paul Greeno as Cabbie
Alice Drummond as Carolyn
Dolores Sutton as Amanda
Mark Margolis as Gage

Lover's Vow
James Remar as Preston	
Rae Dawn Chong as Carola
Robert Klein as Wyatt
Ashton Wise as Jer
Philip Lenkowsky as Maddox
Joe Dabenigno as Cop #1
Larry Silvestri as Cop #2
Donna Davidge as Gallery Patron
Nicole Rochelle as Margaret
Daniel Harrison as John

Production 
The first segment is an adaptation of Sir Arthur Conan Doyle's 1892 short story, "Lot No. 249"; written by Michael McDowell.

The second segment is an adaptation of Stephen King's 1977 short story "The Cat from Hell"; written by George A. Romero

The third and final segment is an adaptation of the legend of the Yuki-onna from Lafcadio Hearn's 1904 book Kwaidan: Stories and Studies of Strange Things; written by Michael McDowell.

"Cat from Hell" was originally going to appear in Creepshow 2, but was scrapped due to budgetary reasons.

Reception

Tales from the Darkside: The Movie was a modest box office success for Paramount. The film was released May 4, 1990 in the United States, opening in third place that weekend. It grossed a total of $16,324,573 domestically.

The film was given a rating of 45% on the ratings aggregation site Rotten Tomatoes, based on 22 reviews, while receiving an overall grade of "C" at Box Office Mojo. Los Angeles Times writer Michael Wilmington criticized Harrison's directing choices ("too much ritzy film noir styling and self-conscious comic book frames") but said "there’s more brain than usual beneath the blood and guts". The Washington Post panned the film, calling it a "lame effort".

Unmade sequel
Laurel Productions initially announced a sequel to the film in October 1990. A screenplay was written by the first film's screenwriters Michael McDowell and George Romero, along with Gahan Wilson. Segments planned included an adaptation of Robert Bloch's "Almost Human", alongside adaptations of Stephen King's short stories "Pinfall" (originally planned for Creepshow 2) and "Rainy Season". This sequel, however, never came to fruition.

References

External links

1990 films
1990 horror films
1990s monster movies
Films based on television series
Films based on works by Stephen King
American supernatural horror films
American monster movies
Paramount Pictures films
American sequel films
American horror anthology films
Films based on multiple works
Films based on short fiction
Gargoyles in popular culture
Mummy films
Films about witchcraft
American films about revenge
Films based on works by Arthur Conan Doyle
Films scored by Jimmy Manzie
Films directed by John Harrison (director)
1990s English-language films
1990s American films

ja:フロム・ザ・ダークサイド#劇場版